Alien is a Swedish rock and metal band formed in Gothenburg in 1986, by guitarist Tony Borg and vocalist Jim Jidhed. They are best known today for their singles "Only One Woman", a cover of a Marbles song, "Tears Dont Put Out The Fire" and "Brave New Love", which was featured in the end credits of the 1988 remake of The Blob.

History

Early success (1986–88)
Borg and Jidhed's original line-up included Ken Sandin on bass guitar, Jimmy Wandroph on keyboards, and Toby Tarrach on drums. This group released the single "Only One Woman" in 1988, a cover of a song written by the Bee Gees and first recorded by The Marbles in 1968. The Alien cover reached No. 1 in Sweden and remained there for six weeks.

Later in 1988, Alien released their first, eponymous album, including "Only One Woman" as well as "Brave New Love" and "Tears Don't Put Out the Fire", which was released as a single later that year. In 1989, the band released a re-worked version of it for the US/international market, again titled Alien. This album included eight out of the twelve tracks released in the 1988 album, five of which were remixed. Two new tracks were added, "Now Love" being one and a cover of "The Air That I Breathe" the other, both sung by new vocalist Peter "Pete" Sandberg.

Shiftin' Gear (1988–93)
In the fall of 1988, Jidhed left the band to spend more time with family and pursue a solo career and was replaced by Peter Sandberg, formerly frontman for the bands Madison and Von Rosen. In 1990, the band also made other changes, such as replacing Wandroph and Tarrach with Bert Andersson on keyboards and Imre Duan on drums. This was the line-up for the band's release of its third album, Shiftin' Gear. However, the album was not the success it was predicted to be and another major line-up change occurred. Andersson was replaced by Richard Andre on keyboards and Stefan Ridderstrale replaced Duan on drums. Former Madison bassist Conny Payne also joined Alien in 1993. Finally, lead singer Peter Sandberg departed the band and later pursued a solo career. To replace him, Alien recruited Daniel Zangger Borch.

Band stability (1993–2005)
Alien returned to the studios to record their fourth album, again titled Alien. Ridderstrale, although performing on tour, did not participate in the recording sessions and Michael Wilkman stood in as drummer. Production was weak and the band lost much of its following. This can also be attributed to the numerous band member changes between 1990 and 1993.

Ridderstrale officially left the band in 1995 and Staffan Scharrin became the drummer, thus completing the band's present lineup. This new formation released the band's fifth album, Crash in 1995. This album featured heavier metal songs than previously recorded by Alien.

Since then, Alien released three more albums, Best and Rare (1997, compilation), Live in Stockholm 1990 (2001) and Dark Eyes (2005). Dark Eyes was the first album to feature all new recordings and marked the return of Jim Jidhed to the band now composed of him, Mats Sandborgh on keyboards, Berndt Ek on bass, Jan Lundberg on drums alongside Borg.

Reunion (2010–present)
Alien has finally reunited with the complete and original line up. They toured in 2010 for the first time since 1989 at Monsters of Rock in Eskilstuna, Sweden, and released their first new single in October 2010 - Ready to Fly. The band released their long-awaited new studio album Eternity on April 25, 2014 through the German-based label AOR HEaven. The band will tour again on August 16, 2014 in Falun, Sweden and again on October 25 at the HEAT festival in Ludwigsburg, Germany.

Band members

Current
 Jim Jidhed (Lead vocalist) - 1987–88, 2005, 2010–present
 Tony Borg (Guitarist) - 1986–95, 2005, 2010–present
 Toby Tarrach (Drums) - 1986–90, 2010–present

Former
 Jimmy Wandroph (Keyboards) - 1986–90, 2019
 Ken Sandin (Bass) - 1986–90, 2019
 Hans Gislasson (Lead vocalist) - 1986–87
 Peter "Pete" Sandberg (Lead vocalist) - 1989–93
 Bert Andersson (Keyboards) - 1990–93
 Imre Duan (Drums) - 1990–93
 Stefan Ridderstrale (Drums) - 1993–95
 Daniel Zangger Borch (Lead vocalist) - 1993–2005
 Conny Payne (Bass) - 1993–2005
 Richard Andre (Keyboards) - 1993–2005
 Michael Wickman (Drums) - 1993–95
 Staffan Scharin (Drums) - 1995–2005
 Mats Sandborgh (Keyboards) - 2005–09
 Berndt Ek (Bass) - 2005–09
 Jan Lundberg (Drums) - 2005–09

Discography

Studio albums
Alien (1988)
Shiftin' Gear (1990)
Alien III (1993)
Crash (1995)
Dark Eyes (2005)
Eternity (2014)
Into The Future (2020)

Remix albums
Alien II (1989) (US edition)

Live albums
Live in Stockholm 1990 (2001)

Compilation albums
Best & Rare (1997)

Singles
"I'll Survive" (1987)
"Headstrong" (1987)
"Tears Don't Put Out the Fire" (1988)
"Go Easy" (1988)
"Only One Woman" (1988)
"The Air That I Breathe" (1989)
"Easy Livin'" (1989)
"Angel Eyes" (1990)
"Turn on the Radio" (1990)
"Take Me to Heaven" (1993)
"Number One" (1993)
"Vit Jul" (1993)
"Ready to Fly" (2010)
"Imagine" (2018)
"Night of Fire" (2020)
"What Are We Fighting For" (2020)

References

External links
 Biography
 Discography
 Biography and Discography at Musicmight
 Jim Jidhed's official website

Virgin Records albums
Swedish glam metal musical groups
Swedish rock music groups
Frontiers Records artists
Musical groups established in 1987
1987 establishments in Sweden